} is a train station in the town of Koumi, Minamisaku District, Nagano Prefecture, Japan, operated by East Japan Railway Company (JR East).

Lines
Managashi Station is served by the Koumi Line and is 49.9 kilometers from the terminus of the line at Kobuchizawa Station.

Station layout
The station consists of one ground-level side platform serving a single bi-directional track.  The station is unattended.

History
Managashi Station opened on 11 March 1919.  With the privatization of Japanese National Railways (JNR) on 1 April 1987, the station came under the control of JR East.

Surrounding area
Chikuma River
Koumi High School
Chichibu incident Historical Park

See also
 List of railway stations in Japan

References

External links

 JR East station information 

Railway stations in Nagano Prefecture
Railway stations in Japan opened in 1919
Stations of East Japan Railway Company
Koumi Line
Koumi, Nagano